Saskia Burmeister (born 12 February 1985) is an Australian actress. She is most known for her roles in Hating Alison Ashley and Sea Patrol.

Early and personal life
Born in New South Wales, Burmeister grew up in Bellingen on the Mid-North Coast of New South Wales. She was educated at Mosman High School in Sydney, and trained at the Australian Theatre for Young People.

In February 2008, Burmeister married Australian actor Jamie Croft. Burmeister first met Croft at a film audition and after they played a couple in The Pact, they began dating. Burmeister and Croft have two sons together, Jackson Jay "JJ", born in May 2012, and Bodhi Phoenix in June 2014.

Career
During high school, Burmeister performed in various theatre productions including Blackrock, The Merchant of Venice and Chapel Perilous.

Burmeister joined the cast of Wicked Science as Dina Demiris in 2003. She appeared in the 2005 comedy film Hating Alison Ashley and received a nomination for Best Lead Actress from the Australian Film Institute (AFI) for her performance.

Burmeister made a guest appearance in Blue Heelers and earned the 2006 AFI award for Best Guest or Supporting Actress in a Television Series for her performance in episode 493.

In 2007, Burmeister joined the cast of Sea Patrol as Nikki Caetano. That same year, Burmeister appeared in The Jammed and earned an AFI nomination for Best Supporting Actress.

On 24 April 2011, Lizzy Lovette of The Sun-Herald reported Burmeister had joined the cast of Home and Away. Burmeister had an extended guest role as Tegan Callahan. The actress bleached her usual brown hair blonde for the part. Burmeister's younger sister, Martika Sullivan, also landed a role in the show at the same time.

Burmeister joined the cast of Black & White & Sex in 2012 and had a guest role in Tricky Business.

Filmography

References

External links

TV Week interview

1985 births
AACTA Award winners
Actresses from Sydney
Australian film actresses
Australian television actresses
Australian child actresses
Living people
People from the Mid North Coast